Lilotomab (formerly tetulomab, HH1) is a murine monoclonal antibody against CD37, a glycoprotein which is expressed on the surface of mature human B cells.  It was generated at the Norwegian Radium Hospital.

As of 2016 it was under development by the Norwegian company Nordic Nanovector ASA as a radioimmunotherapeutic in which lilotomab is conjugated to the beta radiation-emitting isotope lutetium-177 by means of a linker called satetraxetan, a derivative of DOTA. This compound is called 177Lu-HH1 or lutetium (177Lu) lilotomab satetraxetan (trade name Betalutin).  As of 2016, a phase 1/2 clinical trial in people with non-Hodgkin lymphoma was underway.

References

Further reading 

 

Experimental cancer drugs
Radiopharmaceuticals
Lutetium complexes